Joseph Peyré (13 March 1892, in Aydie (Pyrénées-Atlantiques) – 26 December 1968, in Cannes) was a French writer. He won the Prix Goncourt in 1935 for Sang et Lumières.

Life

His father was a schoolteacher. He studied at Pau, Pyrénées-Atlantiques, at the Lycee Louis-Barthou, then Paris and Bordeaux (Doctor of Laws and Bachelor of Philosophy), he went into journalism.

Three themes animate the work of the "novelist of loneliness and the exaltation of man":

 The desert and travels through the sand, in his Sahara cycle, in particular White Squadron (Renaissance 1931), The Leader in the Star Silver (Carthage 1934), The Legend of goumier Said;
 Spain, seen in Sang et Lumières (1935) or Guadalquivir;
 The mountain, in the Matterhorn (1939) and Mount Everest (1942).

Joseph Peyre has also devoted several books to his native Béarn, The Pit and the house, my Bearn basque to the sea, and the Basque Country: Basque John (illustrated by Ramiro Arrue), The Bridge of spells.

Posterity 
His memory still lives, in Vic-Bihl taurine where tradition persists. The "trophy Joseph Peyre, presented annually by the Peña Garlin of taurine, rewards the triumph of novilladas summer.

Aydie, the birthplace of Peyre, is part of the canton of Garlin; College of Garlin named Joseph Peyre.

Works
 Sur la terrasse, 1922
 Francis Carco, 1923
 Les Complices, 1928
 Xénia, préface by Joseph Kessel, 1930
 L'Escadron blanc, 1931
 Le Chef à l'étoile d'argent, 1933
 Sous l'étendard vert, 1934
 Coups durs, 1935
 Sang et Lumières, 1935
 L'Homme de choc, 1936
 Roc-Gibraltar, 1937
 De cape et d'épée, 1938
 Matterhorn, 1939
 Croix du sud, 1942
 Mont Everest, 1942
 Proie des ombres, 1943
 Romanesque Tanger, 1943
 Sahara éternel, 1944
 Un soldat chez les hommes, 1946
 Mallory et son dieu, 1947
 La Tour de l'or, 1947
 L'Étang Réal, 1949
 La Légende du goumier Saïd, 1950
 Inoa, 1951
 De mon Béarn à la mer basque, 1952
 Guadalquivir, 1952
 Jean le Basque, 1953
 La Passion selon Séville..., 1953
 Le Puits et la Maison , 1955
 Les Quatre Capitaines, 1956
 De sable et d'or, 1957
 Une fille de Saragosse, 1957
 Pays basque, Les Albums des Guides bleus, 1957
 Souvenirs d'un enfant, 1958
 Le Pont des sorts, 1959
 Le Pré aux ours, 1959
 Cheval piaffant - un Basque chez les Sioux, 1960
 Le Plan du soleil, 1960
 Les Lanciers de Jerez, 1961
 Les Remparts de Cadix, 1962
 L'Alcade de San Juan, 1963
 Feu et sang de juillet, 1964

Sources
 Pierre Delay, Joseph Peyré 1892-1968 - L'homme et l'œuvre, J&D Éditions, Biarritz, 1992
 Joseph Peyré - L'Homme de ses livres, Collectif, Actes du colloque international de Pau 1992, Université de Pau et des Pays de l'Adour, J&D Éditions, Biarritz, 1994

1907 births
1998 deaths
Prix Goncourt winners
20th-century French novelists
French male novelists
20th-century French male writers